is a railway station on the Ban'etsu West Line in the city of Kitakata, Fukushima Prefecture,  Japan, operated by East Japan Railway Company (JR East).

Lines

Station layout
Yamato Station has a single side platform and a single island platform connected to the station building by a footbridge. The station is staffed.

Platforms

History
Yamato Station opened on December 15, 1910. The station was absorbed into the JR East network upon the privatization of the Japanese National Railways (JNR) on April 1, 1987.

In fiscal 2017, the station was used by an average of 211 passengers daily (boarding passengers only).

Surrounding area
 former Yamato Town Hall
Aga River

See also
 List of railway stations in Japan

References

External links

 JR East Station information 

Railway stations in Fukushima Prefecture
Ban'etsu West Line
Railway stations in Japan opened in 1910
Kitakata, Fukushima